Isle du Bois Creek may refer to:

Isle du Bois Creek (Missouri)
Isle du Bois Creek (Texas)